Paul Gustav Eduard Speiser (1877–1945) was a German entomologist who specialised in Diptera.

Speiser was first a physician, then a Medizinalrat, a medical adviser to a district. He worked on world Diptera, especially
Nycteribiidae, and was an eminent medical entomologist.

Works
(Partial list)
1900. Venti Specie di Zanzare (Culicidae) Italiane Classate e Descritte e Indicate Secondo la Loro Distribuzione corologica. Centralblatt Bact. Parasit und Infektioskrankheiten 28: 297–402.
1901. Ueber die Nycteribiiden, Fledermausparasiten aus der Gruppe der pupiparen Dipteren. Archiv für Naturgeschichte 66: 31–70.
1902. Studien Uber Diptera Pupipara. Z. Syst. Hym. Dipt. 2: 145–180.
1902. Diptera (Supplement). Diptera Pupipara. Fauna Hawaiiensis 3(2): 86–92.
1908. Dipteren aus Deutschlands afrikanischen Kolonien. Berl. Ent. Z. 52: 127–149.
1910. Orthorhapha. Orthorhapha Brachycera. Wissenschaftliche Ergebnisse der Schwedischen Zoologischen Expedition nach dem Kilimandjaro, dem Meru und den umbgebenden Massaisteppen Deutsch-Ostafrikas 1905–1906 unter Leitung von Prof. Dr. Yngve Sjöstedt. Diptera. P. Palmquists. 2. 65–112.
1923. Aethiopische Dipteren. Weiner Entomologische Zeitung. 40: 81–99.
1904. Zur Nomenclatur blutsaugender Dipteren Amerikas. Insektenbörse 21: 148.
1907. Check-list of North American Diptera Pupipara. Entomological News 18: 103–105. 
1908. Die geographische Verbreitung der Diptera pupipara und ihre Phylogenie. Zeitschrift für Wissenschaftliche Insektenbiologie 4: 437–447.

References

Evenhuis, N. L. 1997: Litteratura taxonomica dipterorum (1758–1930). Volume 1 (A–K); Volume 2 (L–Z). Leiden, Backhuys Publishers 1; 2 VII+1–426; 427–871.

1877 births
1945 deaths
German entomologists
Dipterists